Jeff Shawan (born 1956) is an American politician who served as a member of the Missouri House of Representatives for the 153rd district from 2019 to 2021. He is a member of the Republican Party. In 2020, Shawan did not run for re-election in the House of Representatives.

References

Living people
1950s births
Republican Party members of the Missouri House of Representatives
21st-century American politicians